Ryan William Fulton (born 23 May 1996) is a professional footballer who plays as a goalkeeper for Scottish Championship club Hamilton Academical. Born in England, he is a youth international for Scotland.

Club career

Liverpool
Fulton was born in Burnley, Lancashire and joined Liverpool in 2007, representing them at under-10 level and upwards. Towards the end of the 2013–14 season, he made progress into the Under-21 squad. He featured sporadically during the 2014–15 campaign but was a regular starter in the UEFA Youth League for under-19 teams.

He was first called up to the senior squad for their 2015 summer tour of Asia prior to the 2015–16 season. He was made Liverpool's third-choice keeper, behind Simon Mignolet and Ádám Bogdán, after fellow reserve shot stoppers Danny Ward and Lawrence Vigouroux were sent out on loan.

Loan to Portsmouth
In January 2016, Fulton emerged as a loan target for Portsmouth as well as Aberdeen.

On 22 January 2016, he was signed by Portsmouth on a one-month youth loan deal. He made his senior debut the following day in a 1–0 defeat to Oxford United, a game in which he saved a penalty from Liam Sercombe.

Loan to Chesterfield
On 9 July 2016, he was signed by Chesterfield on a season long loan deal for the 2016–17 season, as cover for the injured first-choice goalkeeper Tommy Lee.

Hamilton Academical
On 18 July 2017, Fulton joined Hamilton Academical on a two-year deal.

International career
Although born in England, he has represented Scotland at under-16, under-19 and under-21 level.

Career statistics

References

External links

1996 births
Living people
Footballers from Burnley
Scottish footballers
Scotland youth international footballers
Scotland under-21 international footballers
English footballers
English people of Scottish descent
Association football goalkeepers
Liverpool F.C. players
Portsmouth F.C. players
Chesterfield F.C. players
English Football League players
Hamilton Academical F.C. players
Scottish Professional Football League players